The International Convention on the Protection of the Rights of All Migrant Workers and Members of Their Families is a United Nations multilateral treaty governing the protection of migrant workers and families. Signed on 18 December 1990, it entered into force on 1 July 2003 after the threshold of 20 ratifying States was reached in March 2003. The Committee on Migrant Workers (CMW) monitors implementation of the convention, and is one of the seven UN-linked human rights treaty bodies. The convention applies as of October 2022 in 58 countries.

Context
In his 9 November 2002 report on strengthening the organization, United Nations Secretary-General Kofi Annan wrote: "It is time to take a more comprehensive look at the various dimensions of the migration issue, which now involves hundreds of millions of people, and affects countries of origin, transit and destination. We need to understand better the causes of international flows of people and their complex interrelationship with development."

Overview
The United Nations Convention constitutes a comprehensive international treaty regarding the protection of migrant workers' rights. It emphasizes the connection between migration and human rights, which is increasingly becoming a crucial policy topic worldwide. The Convention aims at protecting migrant workers and members of their families; its existence sets a moral standard, and serves as a guide and stimulus for the promotion of migrant rights in each country.

In the Preamble, the Convention recalls conventions by International Labour Organization on migrant workers: Migration for Employment Convention (Revised), 1949, Migrant Workers (Supplementary Provisions) Convention, 1975, and on forced labour; Forced Labour Convention and Abolition of Forced Labour Convention as well as international human rights treaties including Convention against Discrimination in Education.

The primary objective of the Convention is to foster respect for migrants' human rights. Migrants are not only workers, they are also human beings. The Convention does not create new rights for migrants but aims at guaranteeing equality of treatment, and the same working conditions, including in case of temporary work, for migrants and nationals. The Convention innovates because it relies on the fundamental notion that all migrants should have access to a minimum degree of protection. The Convention recognizes that regular migrants have the legitimacy to claim more rights than irregular immigrants, but it stresses that irregular migrants must see their fundamental human rights respected, like all human beings.

In the meantime, the Convention proposes that actions be taken to eradicate clandestine movements, notably through the fight against misleading information inciting people to migrate irregularly, and through sanctions against traffickers and employers of undocumented migrants.

Article 7 of this Convention protects the rights of migrant workers and their families regardless of "sex, race, colour, language, religion or conviction, political or other opinion, national, ethnic or social origin, nationality, age, economic position, property, marital status, birth, or other status". And Article 29 protects rights of child of migrant worker to name, to registration of birth and to a nationality.

This Convention is also recalled by the Convention on the Rights of Persons with Disabilities at the Preamble.

Parties and signatories
As of August 2021 countries that have ratified the Convention are primarily countries of origin of migrants (such as Mexico, Morocco, and the Philippines). For these countries, the Convention is an important vehicle to protect their citizens living abroad. In the Philippines, for example, ratification of the Convention took place in a context characterized by several cases of Filipino workers being mistreated abroad: such cases hurt the Filipino population and prompted the ratification of the Convention. However, these countries are also transit and destination countries, and the Convention delineates their responsibility to protect the rights of migrants in their territory, and they have done little to protect those at home.

No migrant-receiving state in Western Europe or North America has ratified the Convention. Other important receiving countries, such as Australia, Arab states of the Persian Gulf, India and South Africa have not ratified the Convention.

Intersessional panel discussion 
In June/July 2022, at the Human Rights Council Fiftieth session, the Human Rights Council held an Intersessional panel discussion on the human rights of migrants in vulnerable situations that were previously stated under 35/17 and 47/12 resolutions. The High Commissioner pointed out concerns related to the criminalization of migration, gender-based violence, arbitrary detention, family separation, loss of lives, harmful and dehumanizing narratives, and pervasive discrimination owing to personal factors, including age, gender, or disability. The broader impact of COVID-19 was also highlighted. Statements were provided by panelists reiterating that all migrants, regardless of status, were entitled to all human rights. Concerns on situations of vulnerability that migrants encountered in transit and at borders and violence perpetrated against migrants, including by State and non-State actors were also referred. Calls were made for independent mechanisms to monitor human rights violations, increase attention to the human rights of migrants, the importance of international cooperation, and the need to translate these rights into adequate legal and regulatory provisions. Additional recommendations included the need for implementing comprehensive protection regimes to identify and address situations of vulnerability in the process of migration. Remarks were made on the need for the international community to understand the root causes of migration and the challenges associated with it, and the range of measures that are needed to respond adequately to those challenges. Annual panel discussions were suggested by the High Commissioner.

See also
Convention on domestic workers
Foreign worker
Immigration
International Convention on the Protection of the Rights of All Migrant Workers and Members of Their Families
International Labour Organization
International Migrants Day
International Organization for Migration
Migrant workers
Migration for Employment Convention (Revised), 1949
Migrant Workers (Supplementary Provisions) Convention, 1975
Universal Declaration of Human Rights

Notes

References

External links
 Full text of the Convention (English)
 Full text of the Convention (Spanish)
 Signatures and ratifications
 The Committee on Migrant Workers (which monitors the implementation of the convention)
 The 2002 International Migration Report published by the United Nations Department of Economic and Social Affairs/Population Division
 Special Rapporteur on the Human Rights of Migrants 
 UNESCO Programme on International Migration and Multicultural Policies: Project on the UN Convention on Migrants’ Rights
 International Labour Organization
 International Organization for Migration
 Migrants Rights International
 Migrant Forum in Asia
Declaration on the Rights of Expelled and Deported Persons

Human rights instruments
United Nations treaties
International Convention on the Protection of the Rights of All Migrant Workers and Members of Their Families
International Convention on the Protection of the Rights of All Migrant Workers and Members of Their Families
International Convention on the Protection of the Rights of All Migrant Workers and Members of Their Families
Treaties of Albania
Treaties of Algeria
Treaties of Argentina
Treaties of Azerbaijan
Treaties of Bangladesh
Treaties of Belize
Treaties of Benin
Treaties of Bolivia
Treaties of Bosnia and Herzegovina
Treaties of Burkina Faso
Treaties of Cape Verde
Treaties of Chad
Treaties of Chile
Treaties of Colombia
Treaties of East Timor
Treaties of Ecuador
Treaties of Egypt
Treaties of El Salvador
Treaties of Fiji
Treaties of the Gambia
Treaties of Ghana
Treaties of Guatemala
Treaties of Guinea
Treaties of Guinea-Bissau
Treaties of Guyana
Treaties of Honduras
Treaties of Indonesia
Treaties of Jamaica
Treaties of Kyrgyzstan
Treaties of Lesotho
Treaties of the Libyan Arab Jamahiriya
Treaties of Madagascar
Treaties of Malawi
Treaties of Mali
Treaties of Mauritania
Treaties of Mexico
Treaties of Morocco
Treaties of Mozambique
Treaties of Nicaragua
Treaties of Niger
Treaties of Nigeria
Treaties of Paraguay
Treaties of Peru
Treaties of the Philippines
Treaties of Rwanda
Treaties of Senegal
Treaties of Sri Lanka
Treaties of Seychelles
Treaties of Saint Vincent and the Grenadines
Treaties of Syria
Treaties of Tajikistan
Treaties of Turkey
Treaties of Uruguay
Treaties of Uganda
Treaties of Venezuela
Labour treaties
1990 politics in New York (state)
Treaties adopted by United Nations General Assembly resolutions
1990 in labor relations